Dancing Lady Mountain is a summit in Glacier County, Montana, in the United States and it is located within Glacier National Park. Dancing Lady is derived from a Blackfoot-language name. The mountain's former name of Squaw Mountain was changed due to ongoing controversy over the term "squaw".

See also
 Mountains and mountain ranges of Glacier National Park (U.S.)

References

Mountains of Glacier County, Montana
Mountains of Glacier National Park (U.S.)
Lewis Range